The Brainerd Schoolhouse is a one-room schoolhouse located at 35 Brainerd Street in Mount Holly Township, Burlington County, New Jersey, United States. Built in 1759, it is the oldest building of its type in the state and now a museum. Listed as the John Brainard School, it was documented by the Historic American Buildings Survey in 1936. Listed as the Old Schoolhouse, it was added to the National Register of Historic Places on November 26, 2008, for its significance in education. It is a contributing property to the Mount Holly Historic District. It is owned and operated by the National Society of the Colonial Dames of America.

History and description
The brick building was constructed in 1759 with vernacular Georgian architecture. According to the NRHP documentation, the school has been erroneously associated with the Presbyterian minister and missionary John Brainerd (1720–1781). HABS also warned about this association.

See also
 List of the oldest buildings in New Jersey
 National Register of Historic Places listings in Burlington County, New Jersey

References

External links
 
 

One-room schoolhouses in New Jersey
School buildings on the National Register of Historic Places in New Jersey
Brick buildings and structures
Mount Holly, New Jersey
National Register of Historic Places in Burlington County, New Jersey
1759 establishments in New Jersey
Infrastructure completed in 1759
National Society of the Colonial Dames of America
Individually listed contributing properties to historic districts on the National Register in New Jersey
Historic American Buildings Survey in New Jersey
New Jersey Register of Historic Places